Katherine Clarke may refer to:

 Katherine Clarke (artist)
 Katherine Clarke (historian)

See also
 Katherine Clark
 Catherine Clarke (disambiguation)
 Catherine Clark (disambiguation)